St. James Island is an inhabited area along the Florida Panhandle surrounded by the Carrabelle River, Crooked River, Ochlockonee River, and St. George Sound in Franklin County, Florida. It is separated from the mainland by the tidal Crooked River.

The city of Carabelle and communities of Lanark Village, St. Teresa, Alligator Point, and Bald Point are on the island. Bald Point State Park is on the eastern end of the island and another part of the island is in Tate's Hell State Forest. The area has been used commercially for timber and commercial fishing with tourism and retirement increasing more recently. Locally it is not usually spoken of as an island.

References

Islands of Franklin County, Florida
Islands of Florida